The Simonson Farmstead is a historic house in Mission Hill, South Dakota. It was built in 1890, and designed in the Dutch Colonial Revival architectural style, with a gable roof. A gambrel roof was added in 1906. The house has been listed on the National Register of Historic Places since April 16, 1980.

References

Dutch Colonial Revival architecture in the United States
National Register of Historic Places in Yankton County, South Dakota
Houses completed in 1890